HMS Forfar has been the name of two Royal Navy ships:

 , a  minesweeper launched 1918 and sold in 1922
 , formerly the liner SS Montrose, requisitioned as an armed merchant cruiser in 1939 and sunk in 1940

References

Royal Navy ship names